The 2012 Trans-Am Series was the 44th season of the Sports Car Club of America's Trans American Road Racing Championship.

New management
From 2012 onward, Trans-Am Race Company, LLC, has managed the series. They will manage the series until at least 2016. They are looking to "bring the series back to its glory years". Their plan is to get away from the new, three-class format and return to the pony cars that made the series famous.

The series also established a media partner, GoRacingTV. Select markets would also be able to view Trans Am races on MAVTV. GoRacingTV was a website providing highlights of various racing events.

News

It was announced on November 17, 2011, that a new Ford Mustang was in the works for entry into the series during the 2012 season. The car will use the 302 cubic inch (5 liter) engine from the production model.

Highlights

Though he won only one race, Chuck Cassaro would go on to overcome Tim Gray's four victories and win the GGT Championship by a comfortable 36 points, giving (American manufacturer) Panoz its first ever Trans Am title. With a GGT win at Mid Ohio, courtesy of Belgian driver Jan Heylen, Dodge garnered its first Trans Am victory since 2001.

Schedule

Source:

Driver standings

TA

TA2

GGT

References

External links
Trans Am rulebook for 2012

Trans-Am Series
Trans-Am